Butalbital/acetaminophen, sold under the brand name Butapap among others, is a combination medication used to treat tension headaches and migraine headaches. It contains butalbital, a barbiturate and paracetamol (acetaminophen), an analgesic. Versions also containing caffeine are sold under the brand name Fioricet among others. It is taken by mouth. The combination is also sold with codeine.

The most common side effects include sleepiness, dizziness, trouble breathing, and abdominal pain. Other severe side effects may include liver problems, confusion, addiction, and allergic reactions. Frequent use may result in medication overuse headache. Barbiturate withdrawal may occur if rapidly stopped following long term use. Use is not generally recommended during pregnancy or breastfeeding.

The combination was approved for medical use in the United States in 1984. It is available as a generic medication. In 2020, the combination butalbital/acetaminophen/caffeine was the 201st most commonly prescribed medication in the United States, with more than 2million prescriptions. In the United States it is a schedule III controlled substance in some states but not federally. It is banned in a number of European countries.

Medical uses
Butalbital/acetaminophen is indicated for the treatment of tension headaches.

Butalbital/acetaminophen/caffeine is indicated for the treatment of tension headaches.

Side effects
Commonly reported side effects include euphoria, dizziness or lightheadedness, drowsiness or sedation, intoxication, nausea, vomiting, dependence, shortness of breath, and abdominal pain.

Prolonged use can cause rebound headaches.

Rarely, use of barbiturates can lead to Stevens–Johnson syndrome.

Overdose
Butalbital exerts its toxicity through excessive sedation, resulting in respiratory depression and ultimately death via hypoxia. Nonlethal overdoses may also result in coma and death. There is no specific antidote to barbiturate overdose; treatment is supportive, generally  including the administration of intravenous saline, naloxone, thiamine, glucose, sodium bicarbonate to alkalize the urine and increase rate of excretion, and activated charcoal via nasogastric tube.

Acetaminophen exerts its toxicity through the production of a toxic metabolite that can cause liver damage at doses as low as four grams. Larger doses can precipitate acute liver failure, acute kidney injury, or gastrointestinal bleeding; death has been known to occur with ingestion of ten to fifteen grams. The specific antidote to acetaminophen overdose is N-acetylcysteine.

Mechanism of action
Butalbital exerts a generalized depressant effect on the central nervous system and, in very high doses, has peripheral effects. Acetaminophen has analgesic and antipyretic effects mediated by a metabolite that acts at cannabinoid receptors. Caffeine is thought to produce constriction of cerebral blood vessels and serves to counteract the sedative effect of butalbital.

Butalbital has a half-life of about 35 hours. Acetaminophen has a half-life of about 1.25 to 3 hours, but may be increased by liver damage and after an overdose. Caffeine has a half-life of about 2.5 to 4.5 hours.

References

External links 
 
 

Wikipedia medicine articles ready to translate
Analgesics
Combination drugs